Mahmudur Rahman Mazumdar (December 25, 1922-19 December 2011) was a Bangladesh Army brigadier who was the most senior ethnic Bengali officer in Pakistan Army during the Bangladesh Liberation War.

Early life and education
Majumdar was born into a Bengali Muslim family on 25 December 1922 in the village of Chandinagar in Katigora Thana, Cachar district, Assam Province, British Raj. His ancestral home was in the village of Bolramer Chok in Kaskanakpur Union, Zakiganj Upazila, Sylhet District, Bangladesh. His father was Wajid Ali Majumdar.

After completing his primary and secondary education locally, Majumdar studied at the Murari Chand College in Sylhet where he graduated as a Bachelor of Arts.

Career
In 1950, he joined the Pakistan Army as a captain. During the Indo-Pakistani War of 1965, he commanded the Sialkot Sector. He earned the status of Brigadier in 1969 making him the first Bengali in the Pakistan Army to earn that title.

Mazumdar defected from the Pakistan Army at the start of the Bangladesh Liberation War, becoming the commanding officer of East Pakistan Regiment Centre He was arrested and charged with treason by the Pakistan Army during the war. He was tortured in custody.

Mazumdar after retiring from Bangladesh Army joined the Jatiya Party. He was elected to Parliament from Sylhet twice.

Death
Mazumdar died on 19 December 2011.

References

1922 births
2011 deaths
People from Zakiganj Upazila
People from Cachar district
Jatiya Party politicians
Bangladesh Army brigadiers
3rd Jatiya Sangsad members
4th Jatiya Sangsad members
21st-century Bengalis
20th-century Bengalis